The Decalogue is a 2017 soundtrack album to the Justin Peck ballet of the same name, by Timo Andres and Sufjan Stevens. The album was released by Asthmatic Kitty to mixed reviews. The ballet debuted in 2017 with the New York City Ballet.

Reception
The editorial staff of AllMusic gave the album three out of five stars, with reviewer Mark Deming writing, "[it] sometimes feels rather incomplete, especially presented in such elemental form, but committed fans will want to give it a listen, and it's good to hear this unique talent willing to push his own stylistic boundaries". Noah Yoo of Pitchfork gave it a 6.5 out of 10, summing up his review, "The Decalogue is a Stevens curio like Enjoy Your Rabbit and The BQE before it: riveting to diehards, an agreeable footnote for anyone else".

Track listing
"I" – 3:36
"II" – 1:40
"III" – 1:29
"IV" – 3:04
"V" – 2:37
"VI" – 2:55
"VII" – 3:01
"VIII" – 3:01
"IX" – 2:13
"X" – 3:42

Personnel
Timo Andres – piano
Sufjan Stevens – composition

References

External links

Press release from Asthmatic Kitty

2019 soundtrack albums
Sufjan Stevens soundtracks
Timo Andres albums
Asthmatic Kitty soundtracks
Classical music soundtracks
Theatre soundtracks